Souk Lahad is an oasis town and commune in the Kébili Governorate, Tunisia, about 15 kilometers northwest of the town of Kébili.

Geography
It is located in the Nefzaoua region on the road from Kébili to Tozeur, just east of the point where the road begins its traversal of the Chott el-Jerid. It is the administrative seat of a delegation of the same name.

Demographics
As of 2004 Soul Lahad had a population of 18,285.

Economy
As suggested by its name—sūq al-aḥad means "Sunday market" in Arabic—the town developed as an agricultural community before light industry was introduced, as well as some tourism, with a luxury hotel.

Gallery

See also
Fatnassa
List of cities in Tunisia

References

External links

Populated places in Kebili Governorate
Communes of Tunisia